State Trunk Highway 125 (often called Highway 125, STH-125 or WIS 125) is a  state highway in Outagamie County in the US state of Wisconsin. It runs from Interstate 41 (i-41) in the Town of Grand Chute east to WIS 47 in Appleton; the route is located entirely within these two municipalities. WIS 125 is maintained by the Wisconsin Department of Transportation (WisDOT).

Route description
WIS 125 begins at a junction with I-41 and County Trunk Highway CA (CTF-CA) in the Town of Grand Chute. From here, the route heads east as a divided highway called College Avenue, passing through a business district. It meets CTF-AA (Bluemound Drive) before passing a baseball diamond. After entering Appleton, the highway meets CTF-A (Lynndale Drive). Past this junction, the route crosses the Canadian National Railway. The highway runs through a mixed residential and business area, passing to the south of Wilson Middle School. After crossing Badger Avenue, WIS 125 terminates at a junction with WIS 47; College Avenue continues east of the intersection. Valley Transit's Route 15 West College bus serves much of WIS 125, including the entire eastern half of the road.

Major intersections

See also

References

External links

125
Transportation in Outagamie County, Wisconsin